Sidheswari is a village in the Cooch Behar II CD block in the Cooch Behar Sadar subdivision of the Cooch Behar district in West Bengal, India

Geography

Location

Area overview
The map alongside shows the north-central part of the district. It has the highest level of urbanisation in an overwhelming rural district. 22.08% of the population of the Cooch Behar Sadar subdivision lives in the urban areas and 77.92% lives in the rural areas. The entire district forms the flat alluvial flood plains of mighty rivers.
 
Note: The map alongside presents some of the notable locations in the subdivision. All places marked in the map are linked in the larger full screen map.

Demographics
As per the 2011 Census of India, Sidheswari had a total population of 4,467.  There were 2,327 (52%) males and 2,140 (48%) females. There were 496 persons in the age range of 0 to 6 years. The total number of literate people in Sidheswari was 3,382 (85.17% of the population over 6 years).

Transport

Culture
The temple of Sidheswari Devi is a brick-built structure having an unusual octagonal shape with a dome on top of it. There is a raised platform in front of the temple. The four-handed goddess is worshipped as a form of goddess Kali. According to Madho Sarup Vats, of the Archaeological Survey,  the temple is an example of British architectural influence. He particularly points out the pillars in the structure. The temple seems to have been built by the Maharajas of Cooch Behar State in end 19th century or early 20th century.

Sidheswari temple picture gallery

References

External links

Villages in Cooch Behar district